Alectryon subcinereus, commonly named native quince, wild quince or bird's eye, is a species of shrubs or small trees, constituting part of the plant family Sapindaceae.

They are endemic to eastern Australia, from far eastern Victoria northwards, through eastern New South Wales and through to central Queensland.

References

External links

subcinereus
Flora of New South Wales
Flora of Queensland
Flora of Victoria (Australia)
Sapindales of Australia